The Anointed King / Beili Wang (被立王) is a new religious movement of Christian origin in the People's Republic of China, which possibly had more than 100,000 members at its peak. It emphasizes eschatology and is in favor of a Christian empire. Founded in Anhui in 1987 or 1988, It was present in Anhui, Hunan, Guangdong and possibly other areas (Including Taiwan and Southeast Asia). Its founder, Wu Yangming (吴扬明), formerly of The Shouters, took the title Beili Wang. Beili Wang has been banned in the People's Republic of China since 1995, and Wu was executed for rape.

See also 

 Heterodox teachings (Chinese law)
 Protestantism in China

References 

Apocalyptic groups
Christian new religious movements
Christian denominations founded in China